The Skyliners Synchronized Skating Team is a synchronized skating team from the New York metropolitan area.

Skyliners Synchronized Skating Team was established in 2001, and started competing internationally in 2003. they are two-time world championships competitors, three-time Junior worlds medalists (2018–2019, 2022), seven-time U.S national medalists (2015–2020, 2022), and four-time U.S junior national champions (2017–2020).

Programs

Competitive highlights 

 CS – ISU Challenger Series
 Jr – Junior team placement

Results since 2017–18

2008–09 to 2016–17 seasons

References

External links 

 Skyliners Home Page
 Skyliners Facebook
 Skyliners Twitter
 Skyliners Senior Team Instagram
 Skyliners Junior Team Instagram

Senior synchronized skating teams
Junior synchronized skating teams